Win Your Wish List is a British game show that first aired on BBC One as a National Lottery show from 27 December 2014 to 7 May 2016 with Shane Richie as host, as The National Lottery's Win Your Wish List. In 2018, the programme was revived by Channel 5 with Gino D'Acampo as host, billed as Gino's Win Your Wish List.

Format
In each episode, a family of five compete in six timed rounds to try to win prizes from a list of six gifts they have previously chosen (their "Wish List"). In most rounds, the team is tasked with answering trivia questions from a given category, with one member assigned to read the questions, and one assigned to answer them.

A meter is displayed on a screen in the studio floor, which is divided into green and red zones, and begins at the centre: the meter continuously drains towards the red zone throughout the round, but correct answers move the meter steps toward the green zone. If the meter reaches the outer edge of the green zone before time runs out, the round's prize is won instantly. Otherwise, if the meter is within the green zone when time runs out, the prize becomes available to win during the final round.

If the meter runs out in the red zone, or is otherwise within the red zone when time expires, the prize is lost and cannot be won in the final. Once during the game, a family member not playing in a challenge may reset the meter back to the centre.

The original BBC version of the series used only trivia rounds, and was played by couples. The Channel 5 revival uses family teams instead, and some rounds may involve physical challenges (such as throwing balls into buckets strapped to Gino's waist, with each catch scored on the meter in a similar manner to correct answers).

After the six rounds, the team plays a final, timed trivia round to try and win the remaining prizes that were not won instantly.

Series Overview

Transmissions

Series 1

Series 2

Series 3

Series 4

Series 5

International versions

References

External links

2014 British television series debuts
2021 British television series endings
BBC Scotland television shows
BBC television game shows
British game shows about lotteries
2010s British game shows
2020s British game shows
Channel 5 (British TV channel) original programming
British television series revived after cancellation
Television series by Sony Pictures Television